Elisabeth of Brunswick-Calenberg (8 April 1526 in Nienover – 19 August 1566 in Schleusingen) was a princess of Brunswick-Calenberg by birth and by marriage a Countess of Henneberg.

Life 
Elizabeth was the eldest child of the Duke Eric I of Brunswick-Calenberg and his wife Elisabeth (1510-1558), the daughter of Elector Joachim I of Brandenburg.  Elisabeth was raised as a strict Protestant by her mother.

Elisabeth married on 19 August 1543 in Münden to Count George Ernest of Henneberg (1511-1583). His brother Poppo XII had married Elsiabeth's mother two years earlier. The monastery at Weende contributed 350 guilders towards this dowry. As her jointure, she was promised the districts of Schleusingen, Themar and Suhl. Via his marriage to Elisabeth, George Ernest came into contact with the leading Protestant dynasties in Germany.

Elisabeth's marriage remained childless.  She was devoted to piety and charity and was considered "peaceful".  As a strictly evangelical countess consort, she played a decisive rôle in converting the county of Henneberg to Protestantism.  The county provided asylum to several displaced Protestant preachers.

Elisabeth died on 19 August 1566 and was buried in the castle church in Schleusingen.  Her grave was decorated with an epitaph which had been crafted during her lifetime.  Prior to her death, the Henneberg family buried their dead in Vessra Abbey, however, George Ernest decided to move the family burial location to the Schleusingen.

References 
 Johann Adolph Schultes: Diplomatische Geschichte des Gräflichen Hauses Henneberg, Böhme, 1791, p. 194 ff
 Carl Wernicke: Die Geschichte der Welt, part 1, vol. 3, Duncker, 1855, p. 13

External links 
 http://thepeerage.com/p769.htm#i7682

Footnotes 

Middle House of Brunswick
1526 births
1566 deaths
House of Henneberg
German countesses
16th-century German people
Daughters of monarchs